Portersville is an unincorporated community in Lincoln County, in the U.S. state of West Virginia.

History
A post office called Portersville was established in 1879, and remained in operation until 1950. The community was named after David Porter, the original owner of the town site.

References

Unincorporated communities in Lincoln County, West Virginia
Unincorporated communities in West Virginia